Gigle Networks (formerly known as Gigle Semiconductor) was a provider of high performance system-on-a-chip semiconductor devices and intelligent switching technology for home network, IPTV, consumer electronics and smart grid applications. The company was based in Barcelona, Spain, Edinburgh, UK, and Redwood City, California.

History
Gigle was a venture capital backed privately held company. The company completed a Series A funding round of $11 million in January 2006, led by Accel Partners and Pond Venture Partners; and a Series B funding round of $20 million in November 2007, led by Scottish Equity Partners with participation from Accel Partners and Pond Venture Partners. In December 2010, the company was acquired by Broadcom for $75 million.

Gigle announced 1 Gbit/s physical layer throughput trials in December 2006.
Gigle was involved in multimedia communications standards such as IEEE P1901 and G.hn. Gigle Networks was a board member of the HomePlug Powerline Alliance, a co-founder of the Homegrid Forum a member of the Home Gateway Initiative and the Broadband Forum.

References

External links
 Official Gigle Networks website

Networking companies
Fabless semiconductor companies
Privately held companies
Companies established in 2005
Power-line communication Internet access
Semiconductor companies of Spain